Mordellistena nigritula is a species of beetle in the genus Mordellistena of the family Mordellidae. It was described by Ermisch in 1968.

References

Beetles described in 1968
nigritula